The 2019 Australian Swimming Championships were held from 7 to 12 April 2019 at the South Australia Aquatic and Leisure Centre in Adelaide, South Australia.

Following Australia's performance at the 2016 Rio Olympics where 29 medals were won and finishing 10th on the medal tally, Swimming Australia announced in the February 2017 that the timing of the selection trials would be modified. Historically, the trials were held in April several months before the Olympics were held. This will be now changed to follow the American model where the trials are held six weeks before. The 2019 Australian World Swimming Trials will be held at the Brisbane Aquatics Centre in June 2019 and will be selection trials for the 2019 World Aquatics Championships in Gwangju, South Korea.

This event doubled up as the national trials for the 2019 World Para Swimming Championships in London, the 2019 Summer Universiade in Naples, Italy and the 2019 FINA World Junior Swimming Championships in Budapest, Hungary.

There was an increase in the number of events contested from 63 to 64 from the 2018 National Championships with addition of the mixed 4 × 100 m medley relay. This was due to the IOC announcing in June 2017 that this event as well as the men's 800 m freestyle and the women's 1500 m freestyle events will be added to the Olympic swimming program at the Tokyo 2020 Games.

Emily Seebohm chose to miss this meet to participate in the inaugural FINA Champions Swim Series event in Guangzhou, China, while Thomas Fraser-Holmes was away competing at the Helsinki Swim Meet and Bergen Swim Festival. Mack Horton was forced out due to a shoulder injury. 

During night three of the championships, Cate Campbell on behalf of Swimming Australia paid tribute to Kenneth To who died a few weeks prior.

Defending women's 200 metre backstroke champion Kaylee McKeown was disqualified during the heats of the event. She was permitted to swim a time trial where she stopped the clock at 2:08.56 well ahead of Minna Atherton's winning time of 2:11.18 in the final.

The legends relay was a mixed 4 × 50 m freestyle event swum on the penultimate night of the meet. The team were:
 Team Bramham - Andrew Abood, Brooke Hanson, Sam Bramham and Robert van der Zant
 Team Klim - Michael Klim, Dimity Douglas, Sally Hunter, Phil Rogers
 Team Trickett - Christian Sprenger, Linley Frame, Libby Trickett, Bill Kirby
 Team Schipper - Brenton Rickard, Anna McVann, Jessicah Schipper, Craig Stevens

The event was won by Team Bramham in a time of 1:47.14, followed by Team Schipper (1:49.72), Team Trickett (1:50.01) and Team Klim (1:52.54).

Schedule  

M = Morning session, E = Evening session

Medal winners
The results are below.

Men's events

Men's multiclass events

Women's events

Women's multiclass events

Mixed events

Mixed multiclass events

Legend:

Records broken
During the 2019 Australian Swimming Championships the following records were set.

World records
 Men's 50 m freestyle S14 – Ricky Betar, Auburn (24.37) (final) (S14)
 Men's 200 m freestyle S14 – Liam Schluter, Kawana Waters (1:54.79) (final)
 Men's 400 m freestyle S14 – Liam Schluter, Kawana Waters (4:06.53) (final)
 Men's 50 m backstroke S9 – Timothy Hodge, Auburn (29.70) (final)

Commonwealth, Oceanian and Australian records
 Men's 200 m breaststroke – Matthew Wilson, SOPAC (2:07.16) (final)
 Women's 200 m freestyle – Ariarne Titmus, St Peters Western (1:54.30) (final)
 Women's 400 m freestyle – Ariarne Titmus, St Peters Western (3:59.66) (final) (equal)

Australian club records
 Women's 4 × 100 m freestyle relay – Ariarne Titmus, Meg Harris, Abbey Harkin, Shayna Jack, St Peters Western (3:36.27) (final)
 Women's 4 × 200 m freestyle relay – Shayna Jack, Michaela Ryan, Abbey Harkin, Ariarne Titmus, St Peters Western (7:57.03) (final)

All Comers records
 Men's 200 m breaststroke – Matthew Wilson, SOPAC (2:07.16) (final)
 Women's 200 m freestyle – Ariarne Titmus, St Peters Western (1:54.30) (final)

Championship records
 Men's 200 m breaststroke – Matthew Wilson, SOPAC (2:07.16) (final)
 Men's 50 m butterfly – William Yang, Ravenswood (23.23) (final)
 Men's 200 m individual medley – Mitch Larkin, St Peters Western (1:56.83) (final)
 Women's 100 m freestyle – Cate Campbell, Knox Pymble (52.35) (final)
 Women's 200 m freestyle – Ariarne Titmus, St Peters Western (1:54.30) (final)
 Women's 400 m freestyle – Ariarne Titmus, St Peters Western (3:59.66) (final)
 Women's 1500 m freestyle – Kiah Melverton, TSS Aquatic (15:58.09) (final)
 Women's 4 × 100 m freestyle relay – Ariarne Titmus, Meg Harris, Abbey Harkin, Shayna Jack, St Peters Western (3:36.27) (final)
 Women's 4 × 200 m freestyle relay – Shayna Jack, Michaela Ryan, Abbey Harkin, Ariarne Titmus, St Peters Western (7:57.03) (final)

World Para Swimming Championships team
On 12 April 2019, the team for the 2019 World Para Swimming Championships was announced. 34 members were named with the nine making their international debut.

Club points scores
The final club point scores are below. Note: Only the top ten clubs are listed.

Broadcast
The morning sessions were streamed live on the website of Swimming Australia. The evening sessions were broadcast live on 7TWO. This was the fourth national championships to be screen by Seven after securing the broadcast rights with Swimming Australia in September 2015. The commentary team consisted of Basil Zempilas, Ian Thorpe, Giaan Rooney with poolside interviews conducted by Nathan Templeton.

Notes

References

Swimming Championships
Australian championships
Australian Swimming Championships
Sports competitions in Adelaide
2010s in Adelaide
Australian Swimming Championships